The Gediz Delta is the river delta at the confluence of the Gediz River with the Gulf of İzmir, in İzmir Province in western Turkey. It is a 14,900 ha area of land that occupies coastal parts of Foça, Menemen, and Çiğli districts. It is one of the largest areas of coastal wetlands in Turkey
and has a biodiversity of plants and birds. It is a Ramsar site since 1998 and an Important Bird Area since 2000. It is 26 km from İzmir city center.

Flora and fauna
The delta is home to more than 250 bird species and hosts approximately 80,000 birds in winter. It provides shelter for 10% of the world's flamingo population.

History
Remains of the former Ionian town of Leucae is located on the delta.

Economy
Çamaltı Salt Pan, which is located on the delta, provides one third of Turkey's salt production.

References

Ramsar sites in Turkey
Important Bird Areas of Turkey
Landforms of İzmir Province
Landforms of the Mediterranean Sea
River deltas of Asia
Gulf of İzmir
Çiğli District
Foça District
Menemen District